Malleostemon nephroideus is a plant species of the family Myrtaceae endemic to Western Australia.

It is found in a small area in the Mid West region of Western Australia east of Geraldton where it grows in sandy soils.

References

nephroideus
Flora of Western Australia
Plants described in 2016
Taxa named by Barbara Lynette Rye